Per is a Latin preposition which means "through" or "for each", as in per capita.

Per or PER may also refer to:

Places 
 IOC country code for Peru
 Pér, a village in Hungary
 Chapman code for Perthshire, historic county in Scotland

Math and statistics 
 Rate (mathematics), ratio between quantities in different units, described with the word "per"
 Price–earnings ratio, in finance, a measure of growth in earnings
 Player efficiency rating, a measure of basketball player performance
 Partial equivalence relation, class of relations that are symmetric and transitive
 Physics education research

Science 
 Perseus (constellation), standard astronomical abbreviation
 Period (gene) or per that regulates the biological clock and its corresponding protein PER
 Protein efficiency ratio, of food
 PER or peregrinibacteria, a candidate bacterial phylum

Media and entertainment 
 PeR (band), a Latvian pop band
 Per (film), a 1975 Danish film

Transport
 IATA code for Perth Airport in Western Australia
 National Rail station code for Penrhiwceiber railway station, Rhondda Cynon Taf, Wales

Other 
 Per (given name), a Scandinavian form of Peter
 Per (storm), a storm in Sweden, in January 2007
 Packed Encoding Rules, in computing, an ASN.1 wire format

See also
 
 
 Perr (disambiguation)
 Pers (disambiguation)
 Purr (disambiguation)